Equinor ASA (formerly Statoil and StatoilHydro) is a Norwegian state-owned multinational energy company headquartered in Stavanger. It is primarily a petroleum company, operating in 36 countries with additional investments in renewable energy. In the 2020 Forbes Global 2000, Equinor was ranked as the 169th-largest public company in the world.  the company has 21,126 employees.

The current company was formed by the 2007 merger of Statoil with the oil and gas division of Norsk Hydro. As of 2017, the Government of Norway is the largest shareholder with 67% of the shares, while the rest is public stock. The ownership interest is managed by the Norwegian Ministry of Petroleum and Energy. The company is headquartered and led from Stavanger, while most of their international operations are currently led from Fornebu, outside Oslo.

The name Equinor was adopted in 2018 and is formed by combining equi, the root for words such as equity, equality, and equilibrium, and nor, indicating that the company is of Norwegian origin. The Norwegian meaning of the former name Statoil is 'state oil', indicating that the oil company is state owned.

History
The heritage of Equinor derives from three major Norwegian petroleum companies Statoil, Norsk Hydro, and Saga Petroleum (the latter two merged in 1999).

Old Statoil

Den Norske Stats Oljeselskap A/S was founded as a limited company owned by the Government of Norway on 14 July 1972 by a unanimous act passed by the Norwegian parliament Stortinget. The political motivation was Norwegian participation in the oil industry on the continental shelf and to build up Norwegian competency within the petroleum industry to establish the foundations of a domestic petroleum industry. Statoil was required to discuss important issues with the Minister of Industry, later Minister of Petroleum and Energy. Statoil was also required to submit an annual report to the parliament.

In 1973, the company started work acquiring a presence in the petrochemical industry. This resulted in the development of processing plants in Rafnes and, in partnership with Norsk Hydro, the Mongstad plant in 1980. In 1981, the company acquired, as the first Norwegian company, operator rights on the Norwegian continental shelf on the Gullfaks field. 198788 saw the largest scandal in the company's history, the Mongstad scandal that made the until then unassailable CEO Arve Johnsen withdraw.

In the 1980s, Statoil decided to become a fully integrated petroleum company and started building the Statoil fuel station brand. The stations in Norway originated as Norol stations, while the stations in Denmark and Sweden were purchased from Esso in 1985, and the stations in Ireland were purchased from British Petroleum in 1992 and ConocoPhillips Jet in the mid 1990s, then sold by Statoil to Topaz Energy in 2006. Statoil also built up a network of stations in part of Eastern Europe in the 1990s.

In 1991, a controversy arose between Statoil and local environmentalists, mainly from Natur og Ungdom and Friends of the Earth Norway, who protested the building of a new research and development centre at Rotvoll, in Trondheim, Norway, a wetlands area close to the city with significant bird life. The controversy climaxed with civil disobedience by the environmentalists, but the centre was still built.

The company was privatised and made a public limited company (allmennaksjeselskap) in 2001, becoming listed on both the Oslo Stock Exchange and the New York Stock Exchange. At the same time, it changed its name to Statoil ASA. The government retained 81.7% of the shares. Through further privatization in 2004 and 2005, the government's share was reduced to 70.9%.

The Statoil/Horton case refers to the company's use of bribes in Iran in 2002–2003 in an attempt to secure lucrative oil contracts in that country. This was mainly achieved by hiring the services of Horton Investments, an Iranian consultancy firm owned by Mehdi Hashemi Rafsanjani, son of former Iranian President Hashemi Rafsanjani. Horton Investments was paid US$15.2 million by Statoil to influence important political figures in Iran to grant oil contracts to Statoil. The corruption scandal was uncovered by the Norwegian paper Dagens Næringsliv on September 3, 2003. In 2006, the company accepted a $10.5 million fine for violating the U.S Foreign Corrupt Practices Act.

In September 2007, Statoil and the Brazilian oil company Petrobras signed a deal aimed at expanding exploration, sub-sea, and biofuels cooperation. Under the agreement, Statoil became a partner on six offshore licenses, as well as expanding biofuels production. Petrobras and Statoil announced plans to create dozens of refineries in Brazil and the rest of the world where vegetable oil will be added to crude to create a no-sulphur fuel. On 4 March 2008, Statoil bought Anadarko Petroleum's 50% share of the Peregrino oil field for $1.8 billion.

In 2007, Statoil bought a large area in the Athabasca oil sand field in Canada after purchasing North American Oil Sands Corporation for $2.2 billion. (In 2012, Statoil had 4 oil sand licences (oljesandlisensene ) as part of the Kai Kos Deh Seh project: Leismer, Corner, Hangingstone, and Thornberry).

In 2009, Statoil launched the world's first operational deep-water floating large-capacity wind turbine, Hywind.

Hydro

In 1965, Hydro joined Elf Aquitaine and six other French companies to form Petronord to perform searches for oil and gas in the North Sea. Hydro soon became a large company in the North Sea petroleum industry, and also became operator of a number of fields, the first being Oseberg.

In the late 1980s, Hydro acquired the Mobil service stations in Norway, Sweden, and Denmark, changing their name to Hydro. In 1995, Hydro merged its stations in Norway and Denmark with Texaco, creating the joint venture HydroTexaco. The service station chain was sold in 2006 to Reitangruppen. In 1999, Hydro acquired Norway's third largest petroleum company Saga Petroleum, which had major upstream operations primarily in Norway and the United Kingdom. The British operations were later sold.

Merger

A merger proposal was announced in December 2006. Under the rules of the EEA, the merger was approved by the European Union on 3 May 2007 and by the Norwegian Parliament on 8 June 2007. Statoil's shareholders hold 67.3% of the new company, with Norsk Hydro shareholders owning the remaining 32.7%. The Norwegian Government, the biggest shareholder in both Statoil and Norsk Hydro, holds 67% of the company. Jens Stoltenberg, the then Norwegian Prime Minister, commented that he viewed the merger as "the start of a new era...creating a global energy company and strengthening Norway’s oil and gas industry."

It has been noted within the analyst community that a proposal will create an entity with much more competitive strength versus its much larger European rivals, including BP, Total, and Shell, while also increasing the ability of the company to make strategic acquisitions, particularly in the Gulf of Mexico. It is the ninth largest oil company in the world, and would be the 48th largest company in the world on the current Fortune Global 500 list with a revenue of NOK 480 billion.

The company's management team was initially to be led by President and CEO Helge Lund (who previously held the same posts at Statoil), with Eivind Reiten, the President and CEO of Hydro, acting as Chairman. However, Reiten decided to resign as chairman three days after the merger because of a possible corruption case in Hydro's former oil division. The Vice-Chair and former Minister of Petroleum and Energy Marit Arnstad served as chairperson until 1 April 2008, when Svein Rennemo took up the post on a permanent basis after resigning as the CEO of the Norwegian oil services company Petroleum Geo-Services (PGS).

To reflect a merger of the two companies and with regards of the minor partner, Hydro, it was decided that the joint company should be given a new name. An actual new name was not decided upon at the time of the merger, and StatoilHydro was created for temporary usage only. The firm announced its intention to revert to the name Statoil ASA, and this was approved by the Annual General Meeting in May 2009. The name was changed on 2 November 2009

The Norwegian state's share of the company after the merge was initially 62.5%. As a parliamentary decision in 2001 said it was a goal that the government should own 67% of Statoil, it was announced that the Norwegian government intended to increase its share. In 2009, it was announced that the Norwegian government had reached its goal of obtaining 67% of Statoil's share.

Investments and developments after 2009
In 2010, Statoil separated its downstream business into a separate listed company Statoil Fuel & Retail. In 2012 Alimentation Couche-Tard bought Statoil Fuel & Retail for $2.8 billion.

On 24 May 2010, Statoil sold a 40% stake in the Peregrino field to Sinochem, the Chinese state-controlled oil company, for a cash sum of $3.07 billion, but retained 60% and the operatorship.

On 7 April 2010, Statoil announced finding oil and gas reserves in the Fossekall prospect just north of the Norne oil field in the Norwegian Sea.

In early June 2011, Statoil ASA has divested 24.1% shares in Gassled joint venture for NOK 17.35 billion ($3.25 billion) to Solveig Gas Norway AS and still has 5% shares in the partnership. In 2016 Statoil sold the Leismer oil sand operation in Canada to Athabasca Oil.

In 2011, Statoil bought Brigham Exploration for $4.4 billion to gain access to its oil shale operations in North Dakota's Bakken formation. In 2012, Statoil sent 45,000 barrels of oil per day by railroad cars from North Dakota.

In November 2011, a Statoil consultant and two others were tried for having received 7 million Norwegian kroner, in exchange for contracts and payments totaling "several tenfold" of millions of Norwegian kroner.

In June 2013, Statoil announced a funded joint venture with Petrofrontier Corp. in Australia. Petrofrontier's Georgina Basin shale oil and gas bearing structures consistent with other producing areas in Australia and North America.

In 2016, Statoil licensed 66% of the Carcará field in the Santos basin from Petrobras for $2.5 billion.

In October 2014, Statoil sold its 15.5% stake in the Shah Deniz gas field in Azerbaijan to Petronas for a fee of $2.25 billion.

Since 1 October 2014, Statoil also supplies natural gas to Ukraine's Naftogaz.

In 2016, Statoil acquired a $3 million share of a US wind turbine leasing company. Statoil expects oil demand to peak in the 2020s, and continually decline thereafter due to electric transportation.

Despite finding no oil at its large exploration prospect in the Arctic in 2017, Statoil announced in October 2017 that the company would not give up exploring the Arctic.

Equinor was contracted to build a wind tower assembly farm in New York City that same year.

In March 2018, Statoil acquired a 50% stake in the Polish Bałtyk Środkowy III and Bałtyk Środkowy II (Middle Baltic II/III) offshore wind farms.

Rebranding to Equinor 

On 15 March 2018, Statoil announced that it would change its name to Equinor following approval by the annual general meeting.

Between 2007 and 2019, the company reported massive losses, including over USD $21.5 billion lost from its US-based assets. In 2019, the company sold its assets in Eagle Ford, Texas to Repsol for $325 million.

In August 2020, Equinor appointed Anders Opedal as its new CEO. That year, the company announced that it would be decreasing employee numbers by 20% and contractor numbers by half in the United States, Canada and the United Kingdom, in response to falling oil prices.

In January 2021, Equinor acquired a contract to provide off-shore wind power to the city of New York in partnership with BP. The contract with New York State was reportedly the largest offshore wind deal offered by an American state to date.

In February 2021, Equinor completed the sale of its shale assets in the Bakken formation of North Dakota to Grayson Mill Energy for $900 million. That month, a spokesperson for the company stated that Equinor was considering further sales of energy assets in the US, in the aftermath of the global oil price war.

In May 2021, Equinor and Italian energy company Eni announced that they were partnering on developing floating wind farms in the North Sea under a contract with the Norwegian government.

Equinor partnered with Norwegian renewable energy company Vårgrønn in 2021 to acquire wind acreage in the Utsira Nord region of the North Sea.

Operations

Oil and gas exploration and production

Equinor is the largest operator on the Norwegian continental shelf, with 60% of the total production. The fields operated are Brage, Heimdal, Grane, Glitne, Gullfaks, Heidrun, Huldra, Kristin, Kvitebjørn, Mikkel, Njord, Norne, Ormen Lange, Oseberg, Sleipner, Snorre, Snøhvit, Statfjord, Sygna, Tordis, Troll, Veslefrikk, Vigdis, Visund, Volve, and Åsgard. The company also has processing plants at Kolsnes, Kårstø, Mongstad, Tjeldbergodden, and Melkøya.

In addition to the Norwegian continental shelf, Equinor operates oil and gas fields in Australia, Algeria, Angola, Azerbaijan, Brazil, Canada, China, Libya, Nigeria, Russia, United States, and Venezuela. Statoil has offices that are looking for possible ventures in the countries of Mexico, Qatar and the United Arab Emirates. The company has processing plants in Belgium, Denmark, France, and Germany. In 2006, Statoil was given approval to implement the world's largest carbon sequestration project as a means to mitigate carbon emissions to the atmosphere.

Equinor is a partner in Brazil's offshore Peregrino oil field, which came on-stream in 2011. Equinor holds a 15.625% interest in the Deep Blue well on Green Canyon 723 in the deepwater Gulf of Mexico.

Equinor has a long history of attempting to get involved in the Russian petroleum sector. Many partnerships have been entered, but the company has never had a major success in Russia. It partnered with Gazprom and Total on the Shtokman project in the Barents Sea, but this was shelved due to high costs and low gas prices. It then shifted from partnership with Gazprom to Rosneft, and in the two companies, have drilled for oil in several areas of Russia, again without any major finds. After the introduction of international sanctions during the Russo-Ukrainian War against Russia, Equinor has kept a much lower public profile on its Russian activities while continuing largely as before. Equinor left Russia in September 2022 after striking a deal with Rosneft, selling its Russian assets and transferring future liabilities and investment commitments for one euro.

The Norwegian economics professor Karl Ove Moene has, in the Norwegian business daily Dagens Næringsliv, raised the question of Equinor and resource curse. Much economic research show that, while natural resources are positive for nations with sound political structures, such as Norway, they are negative for nations with unsound political structures, and will, despite the riches, result in a lower economic growth. Besides his own research, Moene also points to similar results from Paul Collier.

Pipeline operations
Equinor is involved in a number of pipelines, including Zeepipe, Statpipe, Europipe I and Europipe II, and Franpipe from the Norwegian continental shelf to Western Europe in addition to the Baku-Tbilisi-Ceyhan pipeline in Caucasus. The pipelines from Norway are organized through Gassled. In the North Sea, Equinor operates the Oseberg Transport System, Kvitebjørn oil pipeline, Heidrun gas pipeline, Sleipner East pipeline and Vestprosess pipeline.

The company has trading offices for crude oil, refined petroleum products, and natural gas liquids in London, Stamford, Connecticut, and Singapore.

Biofuels

Wind energy

Equinor owns 50% stake in the Polish 1,200-MW Bałtyk Środkowy III and Bałtyk Środkowy II offshore wind farms. It also owns 25% stake in the 385-MW Arkona wind farm offshore Germany. Equinor operates the Sheringham Shoal Offshore Wind Farm with 40% stake in the project and has 50% stake in each Creyke Beck A and B and Teesside A wind farms of the Dogger Bank Wind Farm development in the United Kingdom.

Petrol stations
The company operated fuel stations under the main brand Statoil, fully automated stations under 1-2-3 and some of the stations under Ingo brand in Denmark and Sweden. In September 2007 Statoil acquired all Nordic Jet stations and continued to use the brand name until 2014 when the Nordic stations were rebranded to the new brand name Ingo. After the aquistion of Norsk Hydro in 2007 also operated 118 Hydro and Uno-X fuel station networks in Sweden until were sold together with 40 Jet stations in Norway in 2009 to Finnish company St1. 

In 2010, the downstream operations were separated into new listed company Statoil Fuel & Retail. In total Statoil had about 2,300 fuel station services in Denmark, Estonia, Ireland, Latvia, Lithuania, Norway, Poland, Russia, and Sweden, as well as significant lubricants and aviation fuel operations.

In 2012 Canadian company Alimentation Couche-Tard agreed to buy the company for $2.8 billion. In 2016, Couche-Tard decided to rebrand all fuel stations into the Circle K brand.

Finances 

For the fiscal year 2018, Equinor reported earnings of US$7.535 billion, with an annual revenue of US$79.593 billion, an increase of 30.1% over the previous fiscal cycle. Equinor's shares traded at over $18 per share, and its market capitalization was valued at over US$55.5 billion in October 2018. In the fourth quarter of 2021, Equinor had a profit of $15 billion.

Human rights 
In 2016, Equinor (then Statoil) was ranked as the 5th best of 92 oil, gas, and mining companies on indigenous rights in the Arctic.

Controversies

Mongstad scandal 

In November 1987, several members of the board offered their resignation over approximately $780 million worth of cost overruns at the Mongstad refinery. It was seen as a big scandal in the Norwegian press.

Corrib gas project

Equinor was a partner of Royal Dutch Shell in the Corrib gas project, which had been developing a natural gas field off the northwest coast of County Mayo, Ireland. Citizens protested the project on the grounds that they had been insufficiently consulted and that the pipeline posed a danger. In the summer of 2005, five men from Rossport were jailed for contempt of court after refusing to obey a temporary court injunction, which forbade interfering with the project. The ensuing protests led to the Shell to Sea campaign which opposed the project. In November 2021, Equinor exited the project after selling its 36.5% stake to Vermilion Energy for $434 million (€382 million).

Corruption lawsuit: Iran 

The Statoil corruption case, also known as the Statoil-Horton case (Norwegian: Statoils Horton-sak) refers to Norwegian oil company Statoil’s misconduct and extensive use of bribery in Iran between 2002 and 2003, in an attempt to secure lucrative oil contracts for the company in that country. On June 29, 2004, Statoil was found guilty of corruption by the Norwegian courts and was ordered to pay NOK 20 million in fines. On October 13, 2006, Statoil reached a settlement with US authorities for its involvement in the case and was ordered by a US court to pay US$21 million in fines.

North Sea oil projects
In March 2011, Statoil halted work on two North Sea oil field projects and laid off thousands of people due to a £2 billion U.K. tax on the sector.

Charges of unethical practices in Athabasca
In 2012, a UK company, Ecclesiastical Investment, announced they were selling their stake in Statoil, as a result of perceived unethical practices related to Athabasca oil sands projects.

Arctic 

In May 2012, Equinor signed an Arctic exploration deal with Rosneft. In June 2014, Statoil announced it had completed a 12-month exploration program of its Castberg license project in the Arctic and found less-than-expected oil reserves. Production, which had originally been planned to start in 2018, was temporarily shelved while the company and its partners reassessed the viability of the project and explored ways to reduce development costs.

Great Australian Bight 
Exploration for oil and gas in the Great Australian Bight first began in the late 1960s. Not long ago, several oil majors, BP, Statoil/Equinor, and Chevron proposed plans to drill exploration wells in the southern part of the area from 2017 onwards. On October 11, 2016, BP withdrew its plans to explore the area claiming that it was not competitive and did not align with BP's strategic goals. The proposal to explore in the bight was the focus of community opposition. The Wilderness Society showed that a worst-case scenario leak of oil could have a catastrophic effect on the southern coastline of Australia. The Australian Senate commenced an inquiry into oil or gas production in the Great Australian Bight on 22 February 2016. The committee was reestablished on 13 September 2016 following the Australian Federal Election. In October 2017, Chevron withdrew from the project, but it returned alongside BP in 2019. Though the National Offshore Petroleum Safety and Environmental Management Authority approved exploration plans in late 2019, Equinor withdrew from the project in February 2020, citing profitability reasons.

Losses in the United States 
In 2020, a report revealed important issues regarding $20 billion lost in the United States. According to Equinor chairman Jon Erik Reinhardsen, the losses were driven by an ambitious growth strategy and overly optimistic price assumptions.

Censorship of the Science Museum 

In 2023 it was revealed that a Equinor sponsorship agreement of the Wonderlab exhibition at the Science Museum, London contained a gag clause preventing museum or its trustees “make any statement or issue any publicity or otherwise be involved in any conduct or matter that may reasonably be foreseen as discrediting or damaging the goodwill or reputation of the sponsor”.

Corporate structure

Board of Directors
Comprised as follows as of February 2017:
Øystein Løseth, former CEO of Vattenfall
Roy Franklin, Chairman of Cuadrilla Resources and trained geologist
Bjørn Tore Godal, former Norwegian Minister of Foreign Affairs, Trade and Shipping, and Defense
Lill-Heidi Bakkerud, employee-elected representative, former process engineer at Statoil's Gullfaks oil field
Maria Oudeman, President of Utrecht University
Wenche Agerup, current CCO of Telenor
Rebekka Glasser Herlofsen, current CFO of Torvald Klaveness Group
Jeroen van der Veer, former CEO of Royal Dutch Shell
Stig Lægreid, board representative of the Norwegian Society of Engineers and Technologists
Ingrid Elisabeth di Valerio, board representative for Tekna

Lobbying
Equinor engages professional lobbyists to represent its interests in various jurisdictions. In South Australia, they were represented by the firm Hawker Britton.

Environmental record
Statoil was responsible for 0.52% of global industrial greenhouse gas emissions from 1988 to 2015.

Equinor and Shell were planning on building a gas-fired powerplant in Norway that would infuse CO2 underground or beneath the seabed, but they discarded the plan due to economic reasons. Equinor has injected CO2 into the Utsira formation on the Sleipner gas field for environmental storage purposes since 1996. Natural gas (methane) containing approximately 8.5% CO2 is produced on the Sleipner Vest field. The gas is transported to the Sleipner Treatment platform, where the CO2 is removed. The gas is exported to the UK, Germany, and Belgium, and the CO2 is injected into the Utsira formation.

Sponsorship

Equinor sponsors talents in art, education, and sports through the program Morgendagens helter (Tomorrow's heroes).

Two musical prizes are included in the program. As of 2013, the grant for both awards is of 1 million NOK (about $166,000). The Statoil classical music award has been awarded since 1999. The Statoil stipend to a Norwegian pop/rock artist or group has been awarded since 2008 during the by:Larm festival and is meant to stimulate an international career.

The program also includes an art prize, Statoils kunstpris, that has been awarded every second year since 2007 to a talented artist in Norway. The grant is 500,000 NOK (about $83,000) which makes it Norway's largest prize of its kind.

Sponsorship for sports includes support for football and skiing. Sponsorship for education focuses on natural sciences and included a yearly competition for high school students in Norway where Statoils realfagspris is awarded.

Statoil was an official sponsor of the 2011 FIS Nordic World Ski Championships that was held in Oslo.

References

External links
 

 
Government-owned companies of Norway
Oil companies of Norway
Natural gas companies of Norway
Nor
Multinational oil companies
Multinational companies headquartered in Norway
Ministry of Petroleum and Energy
Norsk Hydro
Companies based in Stavanger
Energy companies established in 1972
Non-renewable resource companies established in 1972
Norwegian companies established in 1972
Purveyors to the Court of Denmark
Companies listed on the Oslo Stock Exchange
Companies listed on the New York Stock Exchange
Norwegian brands
Wind power companies